The Downtown Reno Library is the main library of the Washoe County Library System, at 301 S. Center St. in Reno, Nevada. It occupies a historic Modern-style building listed on the National Register of Historic Places as the Washoe County Library. It is known also as the Downtown Library.  It was designed by Hewitt Campau Wells in Modern style and was built in 1965.

The building received the national Industrial Landscape Award in 1968 for its interior use of plants, shrubs, and trees as an integral part of its design.  The award, presented by Lady Bird Johnson  in Washington, D.C., was given specifically to architect Hewitt Wells, to landscape architect Mitchell Serven, and to Purdy and Fitzpatrick Nursery.
Although the building was less than 50 years old, the usual requirement, it was listed on the National Register of Historic Places in 2013.

It has a fallout shelter which in 2015 was one of the few remaining ones in Reno.

In 2014 Cengage Learning gave the library the award "coolest internal space", giving the library $500.

See also 
Washoe County Library-Sparks Branch (former building), also NRHP-listed

References

External links
 Downtown Reno Library

Public libraries in Nevada
Buildings and structures in Reno, Nevada
Library buildings completed in 1965
Libraries on the National Register of Historic Places in Nevada
National Register of Historic Places in Reno, Nevada
1965 establishments in Nevada
History of Reno, Nevada
1960s architecture in the United States
Modernist architecture in Nevada